The Lauderdale Wildlife Management Area is an  Alabama Wildlife Management Area (WMA) operated by the Alabama Department of Conservation and Natural Resources in Lauderdale County, Alabama near  Waterloo, Alabama.

External links
 Maps of Alabama Wildlife Management Areas from the
 Alabama Department of Conservation and Natural Resources
U.S. Geological Survey Map at the U.S. Geological Survey Map Website. Retrieved February 2, 2023.

Protected areas of Lauderdale County, Alabama
Wildlife management areas of Alabama